Mario Markaj (born 5 March 1995, in Lezha) is a professional Albanian footballer who currently plays as a midfielder for KS Burreli in the Albanian First Division.

References 

1995 births
Living people
People from Lezhë
Association football midfielders
Albanian footballers
Besëlidhja Lezhë players
KF Olimpik Tirana players
KS Burreli players
KF Shënkolli players